Etazeta (Greek: Εταζέτα; fl. 255 BC – 254 BC) was the second wife of Nicomedes I, king of Bithynia and a regent of Bithynia.

Life
An ambitious woman, she was able to persuade her husband to exclude his sons by his former marriage from the throne; instead, the throne would go to Etazeta's children. Since Nicomedes and Etazeta's children were still very young, the king sought to strengthen his family's hold on the Bithynian throne by offering the guardianship of the infants to the sovereigns Ptolemy II of Egypt and Antigonus II of Macedonia; also the city-states of Byzantium, Heraclea and Cius were added to the guardianship.

On the death of Nicomedes I in around 255 BC, Etazeta ruled on behalf of her infant sons. However, Nicomedes' first-born, Ziaelas, refused to accept his father's decision and started a war against his stepmother to conquer the kingdom. Etazeta tried to resist and married the former king's brother, but around 254 BC she was removed by Ziaelas and forced to flee to Macedon with her sons.

References
Memnon, History of Heracleia

3rd-century BC births
People from Bithynia
3rd-century BC Greek people
3rd-century BC Kings of Bithynia
3rd-century BC women rulers
Ancient Greek women rulers
Year of death unknown
Queens of Bithynia
Rulers of Bithynia